The First Greceanîi Cabinet  was the Cabinet of Moldova from 31 March 2008 to 10 June 2009. It was the first government led by Zinaida Greceanîi who was Prime Minister of Moldova from 2008 to 2009.

Cabinet of Minister  

The composition of the cabinet of was as follows:

External links  
 Government of Moldova

 

 

  
Moldova cabinets
2008 establishments in Moldova
2009 disestablishments in Moldova
Cabinets established in 2008
Cabinets disestablished in 2009